Hittarps IK is a Swedish football club located in Helsingborg.

Background
Hittarps IK currently plays in Division 2 Skåne Nordvästra which is the fourth tier of Swedish football. They play their home matches at the Laröds IP in Helsingborg.

The club is affiliated to Skånes Fotbollförbund. The attendance record at Laröds IP was set on 24 June 1987 when 2,117 spectators attended the Division 2 Västra match with Helsingborgs IF.

Season to season

In their most successful period Hittarps IK competed in the following divisions:

In recent seasons Hittarps IK have competed in the following divisions:

Attendances

In recent seasons Hittarps IK have had the following average attendances:

Footnotes

External links
 Hittarps IK – Official website
 Hittarps IK on Facebook

Sport in Skåne County
Football clubs in Skåne County
1959 establishments in Sweden